Parliamentary elections were held in Northern Cyprus on 23 June 1985. The National Unity Party remained the largest party in the National Council, winning 24 of the 50 seats.

Results

References

Northern Cyprus
1985 in Northern Cyprus
Elections in Northern Cyprus
June 1985 events in Europe